Asunder is a free and open-source graphical (GTK 2) audio CD ripper program for Unix-like systems. It doesn't have dependencies to the GNOME libraries (GStreamer and dconf) or libraries of other desktop environments. It functions as a front-end for cdparanoia.

Its first version was released in January 2005. Asunder is free software released under the GNU General Public License version 2.

Features 
 Saves audio tracks as WAV, MP3, Vorbis, FLAC, Opus, WavPack, Musepack, AAC, or Monkey's Audio files
 Uses CDDB protocol to name and tag each track (freedb.freac.org) is the changeable default source)
 Creates M3U playlists
 Encodes to multiple formats in one session
 Simultaneously rips and encodes
 Can encode to multiple formats in one session
 Allows for each track to be tagged by a different artist
 Does not require a specific desktop environment (just GTK)

See also 

 Sound Juicer – The official CD ripper of GNOME
 Other CD rippers for Linux

References

External links

Audio software that uses GTK
Free audio software
Free software programmed in C
Linux CD ripping software
Optical disc-related software that uses GTK